Arthur Henderson VC, MC (6 May 1893 – 24 April 1917) was a Scottish recipient of the Victoria Cross, the highest and most prestigious award for gallantry in the face of the enemy that can be awarded to British and Commonwealth forces.

Henderson was born 6 May 1893 to George Henderson OBE, a Magistrate of Paisley, and Elizabeth Purdie.

He was 23 years old, and an Acting Captain in the 4th Battalion, The Argyll and Sutherland Highlanders (Princess Louise's), British Army, attached to 2nd Battalion during the First World War. On 23 April 1917 near Fontaine-les-Croisilles, France, he performed the deed for which he was awarded the Victoria Cross. He died the following day.

Citation

Further information
Buried at the Commonwealth War Graves Commission's Cojeul British Cemetery, Saint-Martin-sur-Cojeul, Pas-de-Calais, France.

His name appears on the war memorial in Gordon in the Scottish borders, showing the fact that he won the VC.

His VC is on display in the Lord Ashcroft Gallery at the Imperial War Museum, London.

References
Monuments to Courage (David Harvey, 1999)
The Register of the Victoria Cross (This England, 1997)
Scotland's Forgotten Valour (Graham Ross, 1995)

External links
History of Argyll & Sutherland Highlanders

1893 births
1917 deaths
British Army personnel of World War I
British World War I recipients of the Victoria Cross
Argyll and Sutherland Highlanders officers
British military personnel killed in World War I
Recipients of the Military Cross
Military personnel from Paisley, Renfrewshire
British Army recipients of the Victoria Cross